The twenty-first series of the British medical drama television series Casualty commenced airing in the United Kingdom on BBC One on 23 September 2006 and finished on 4 August 2007. This saw an increase in episodes to 48.

Cast

Main characters 

Daphne Alexander as Nadia Talianos (from episode 26)
Luke Bailey as Sam Bateman (until episode 38)
Matt Bardock as Jeff Collier (episodes 24−39)
Ian Bleasdale as Josh Griffiths (until episode 17, from episode 36)
Georgina Bouzova as Ellen Zitek (until episode 16)
Liz Carling as Selena Donovan (until episode 48)
Susan Cookson as Maggie Coldwell
Elyes Gabel as Guppy Sandhu
Kip Gamblin as Greg Fallon
Sam Grey as Alice Chantrey
Jane Hazlegrove as Kathleen "Dixie" Dixon (from episode 3)
Joanne King as Cyd Pyke (from episode 3)
Martina Laird as Comfort Jones (until episode 10)
Simon MacCorkindale as Harry Harper (until episode 25, from episode 47)
Janine Mellor as Kelsey Phillips
Peter O'Brien as Theo "Stitch" Lambert (episodes 31−48)
Suzanne Packer as Tess Bateman
Ben Price as Nathan Spencer
James Redmond as John "Abs" Denham
Derek Thompson as Charlie Fairhead

Recurring and guest characters 

Holly Aird as Laura Merriman (episodes 13−16)
Elizabeth Bell as Peggy Spencer (episode 19)
Alice Bird as Maria Harwood (episodes 42−43)
George Costigan as Stephen Gregory MP (episodes 13−14)
Frank Grimes as Jim McConvey (episodes 30−31)
Jack Dedman as Louis Fairhead (episodes 12−16)
David Firth as Richard Bardon (episodes 6−40)
Brenda Fricker as Megan Roach (episode 29)
Romy Irving as Rosie Merriman (episodes 13−16) 
Gerald Kyd as Sean Maddox (episodes 5−10)
Stella Madden as Nora McConvey (episodes 30−31)
Neil McDermott as Ben Harold (episodes 9 and 13)
Stephen McGann as Sam Roach (episode 29)
James Midgley as Liam York (episodes 30−31)
Jacqueline Pearce as Elspeth Lang (episodes 10 and 12)
Cathy Shipton as Lisa "Duffy" Duffin (episodes 1−2)
Julia St John as Sarah Evans (episode 16)

Episodes

Footnotes
Bardock made an uncredited voiceover appearance on 10 February 2007 (episode 24), before making his first credited appearance on 17 February 2007 (episode 25).

References

External links
 Casualty series 21 at the Internet Movie Database

21
2006 British television seasons
2007 British television seasons